Kiku Sharda (born Raghavendra Sharda; 14 February 1976) is an Indian comedian as well as film and television actor. He was born on 14 February 1976 in Jodhpur, Rajasthan.

He played the character of Hobo in Hatim, Constable Mulayam Singh Gulgule in F.I.R., and Akbar in the comedy show Akbar Birbal. He had worked in Comedy Nights with Kapil, where he played various characters, notably of Palak. He participated in Nach Baliye 6 in 2013 and Jhalak Dikhhla Jaa 7 in 2014.

In 2016, Kiku Sharda was arrested for mimicking Dera Sacha Sauda head, Gurmeet Ram Rahim Singh Insan on a television channel in which Kiku dressed as a baba was shown serving liquor and doing lewd dance with girls which insulted the sect chief.

Filmography

Films

Television

Awards

Controversy 	
In January 2016, Sharda was arrested for mimicking Gurmeet Ram Rahim Singh.

References

External links

Living people
Indian male film actors
Male actors in Hindi cinema
Male actors from Rajasthan
Indian male comedians
Marwari people
1976 births
People from Jodhpur
Rajasthani people